"I Like Boys" is a song by American singer Todrick Hall; he co-produced and co-wrote the song with Jean Yves Ducornet. Hall released the song during Pride 2019. It is the second music video for his EP, Haus Party, Pt. 1. The video opens with Hall coming out to his mother played by Luenell. The video shifts to a desert with Hall surrounded by male dancers and a camel. The song celebrates Hall's sexuality, featuring color, cultural references, and male nudity. Hall describes "I Like Boys" as campy.

Charts

References 

2019 singles
2019 songs
LGBT-related songs
Todrick Hall songs